O. R. Latham Stadium was an outdoor stadium, on the campus of the University of Northern Iowa, in Cedar Falls, Iowa. It was named in honor the Northern Iowa's third president, Orval Ray Latham. 

Following a post-war enrollment boom, the mezzanine level was converted into Stadium Hall, a men's dormitory that opened for the Fall 1947 semester.  This space had housed military personnel during World War II.  Plans announced for the conversion in 1946 called for accommodations for 160 students.  The last students moved out of Stadium Hall in November 1961.

The West Stadium was demolished in the summer of 1976. In the summer of 1987 the East Stadium was demolished.

References

Defunct college football venues
Northern Iowa Panthers football
Sports venues in Iowa
American football venues in Iowa
1936 establishments in Iowa
Sports venues completed in 1936
1987 disestablishments in Iowa
Sports venues demolished in 1987